Aphelandra stephanophysa is a plant species in the family Acanthaceae, which is native to Atlantic Forest vegetation of Brazil. This plant is cited in Flora Brasiliensis by Carl Friedrich Philipp von Martius.

External links
 Flora Brasiliensis: Aphelandra stephanophysa

stephanophysa
Endemic flora of Brazil
Flora of the Atlantic Forest